Flop Goes the Weasel may refer to:
Flop Goes the Weasel - A 1943 Merrie Melodies cartoon.
"Flop Goes the Weasel" - A 1989 episode from Garfield and Friends

See also
Pop Goes the Weasel, the original nursery rhyme that the title of these works refers to.